The 77th United States Congress was a meeting of the legislative branch of the United States federal government, composed of the United States Senate and the United States House of Representatives. It met in Washington, D.C., from January 3, 1941, to January 3, 1943, during the ninth and tenth years of Franklin D. Roosevelt's presidency. The apportionment of seats in the House of Representatives was based on the 1930 United States census.

Both chambers maintained a Democratic majority - with the Senate being a supermajority. With the reelection of President Franklin D. Roosevelt to a then record third term, the Democrats maintained an overall federal government trifecta.

This was the first Congress to have more than one Senate president (John Garner and Henry Wallace) due to the passage of the 20th Amendment in 1933.

Major events

 January 20, 1941: President Franklin D. Roosevelt began his third term. 
 December 7, 1941:  Attack on Pearl Harbor
 December 8, 1941: Joint Session of Congress met to hear President Roosevelt deliver his "Day of Infamy" speech
 December 26, 1941: Joint session of the United States Congress met in the Senate chamber for an address by  British Prime Minister Winston Churchill.

Major legislation and resolutions 

 March 11, 1941: Lend Lease Act, Sess. 1, ch. 11, 
 August 18, 1941: Flood Control Act of 1941, Sess. 1, ch. 377, 
 December 8, 1941: Resolution— War between United States and Japan, Sess. 1, ch. 561, 
 December 11, 1941: Resolution— War between United States and Germany, Sess. 1, ch. 564, 
 December 11, 1941: Resolution— War between United States and Italy, Sess. 1, ch. 565, 
 January 27, 1942: Air Raid Attack Act of 1942, Sess. 2, ch. 20, 
 January 30, 1942: Emergency Price Control Act of 1942, Sess. 2, ch. 26, 
 June 5, 1942: Resolution— War between United States and Bulgaria, Sess. 2, ch. 323, 
 June 5, 1942: Resolution— War between United States and Hungary, Sess. 2, ch. 324, 
 June 5, 1942: Resolution— War between United States and Romania, Sess. 2, ch. 325, 
 June 22, 1942: Resolution— United States Flag Code, including recognition of the Pledge of Allegiance, Sess. 2, ch. 435, 
 October 2, 1942: Stabilization Act of 1942, Sess. 2, ch. 578,

Select committees
 Truman Committee (officially the United States Senate Special Committee to Investigate the National Defense Program)

Leadership

Senate
 President: John Nance Garner (D), until January 20, 1941
 Henry A. Wallace (D), from January 20, 1941
 President pro tempore: Pat Harrison (D), until June 22, 1941
 Carter Glass (D), from July 10, 1941

Majority (Democratic) leadership
 Majority leader: Alben W. Barkley
 Majority Whip: Lister Hill
 Democratic Caucus Secretary: Joshua B. Lee

Minority (Republican) leadership
 Minority leader: Charles L. McNary
 Republican Conference Secretary: Wallace H. White Jr.
 National Senatorial Committee Chair: John G. Townsend Jr.

House of Representatives
Speaker: Sam Rayburn (D)

Majority (Democratic) leadership
Majority leader: John William McCormack
 Democratic Whip: Patrick J. Boland, until May 18, 1942
 Robert Ramspeck
 Democratic Caucus Chairman: Richard M. Duncan
 Democratic Campaign Committee Chairman: Patrick H. Drewry

Minority (Republican) leadership
Minority leader: Joseph William Martin Jr.
 Republican Whip: Harry Lane Englebright
 Republican Conference Chairman: Roy O. Woodruff
 Republican Campaign Committee Chairman: J. William Ditter

Party summary

Senate

House of Representatives

Members

Senate
Senators are elected statewide every two years, with one-third beginning new six-year terms with each Congress. Preceding the names in the list below are Senate class numbers, which indicate the cycle of their election, In this Congress, Class 2 meant their term ended with this Congress, requiring reelection in 1942; Class 3 meant their term began in the last Congress, requiring reelection in 1944; and Class 1 meant their term began in this Congress, requiring reelection in 1946.

Currently, this is the last Congressional session in which the Democratic Party commanded all Senate seats from the South.

Alabama
 2. John H. Bankhead II (D)
 3. J. Lister Hill (D)

Arizona
 1. Ernest McFarland (D)
 3. Carl Hayden (D)

Arkansas
 2. John E. Miller (D), until March 31, 1941
 G. Lloyd Spencer (D), from April 1, 1941
 3. Hattie Caraway (D)

California
 1. Hiram Johnson (R)
 3. Sheridan Downey (D)

Colorado
 2. Edwin C. Johnson (D)
 3. Alva B. Adams (D), until December 1, 1941
 Eugene Donald Millikin (R), from December 20, 1941

Connecticut
 1. Francis T. Maloney (D)
 3. John A. Danaher (R)

Delaware
 1. James M. Tunnell (D)
 2. James H. Hughes (D)

Florida
 1. Charles O. Andrews (D)
 3. Claude Pepper (D)

Georgia
 2. Walter F. George (D)
 3. Richard Russell Jr. (D)

Idaho
 2. John W. Thomas (R)
 3. David Worth Clark (D)

Illinois
 2. Charles W. Brooks (R)
 3. Scott W. Lucas (D)

Indiana
 1. Raymond E. Willis (R)
 3. Frederick Van Nuys (D)

Iowa
 2. Clyde L. Herring (D)
 3. Guy Mark Gillette (D)

Kansas
 2. Arthur Capper (R)
 3. Clyde M. Reed (R)

Kentucky
 2. Happy Chandler (D)
 3. Alben W. Barkley (D)

Louisiana
 2. Allen J. Ellender (D)
 3. John H. Overton (D)

Maine
 1. Owen Brewster (R)
 2. Wallace H. White Jr. (R)

Maryland
 1. George L. P. Radcliffe (D)
 3. Millard Tydings (D)

Massachusetts
 1. David I. Walsh (D)
 2. Henry Cabot Lodge Jr. (R)

Michigan
 1. Arthur H. Vandenberg (R)
 2. Prentiss M. Brown (D)

Minnesota
 1. Henrik Shipstead (R)
 2. Joseph H. Ball (R), until November 17, 1942
 Arthur E. Nelson (R), from November 18, 1942

Mississippi
 1. Theodore G. Bilbo (D)
 2. Pat Harrison (D), until June 22, 1941
 James Eastland (D), June 30, 1941 – September 28, 1941
 Wall Doxey (D), from September 29, 1941

Missouri
 1. Harry S. Truman (D)
 3. Bennett Champ Clark (D)

Montana
 1. Burton K. Wheeler (D)
 2. James Edward Murray (D)

Nebraska
 1. Hugh A. Butler (R)
 2. George William Norris (I)

Nevada
 1. Berkeley L. Bunker (D), until December 6, 1942
 James G. Scrugham (D), from December 7, 1942
 3. Pat McCarran (D)

New Hampshire
 2. Styles Bridges (R)
 3. Charles W. Tobey (R)

New Jersey
 1. William Warren Barbour (R)
 2. William H. Smathers (D)

New Mexico
 1. Dennis Chavez (D)
 2. Carl Hatch (D)

New York
 1. James M. Mead (D)
 3. Robert F. Wagner (D)

North Carolina
 2. Josiah William Bailey (D)
 3. Robert Rice Reynolds (D)

North Dakota
 1. William Langer (R-NPL)
 3. Gerald Nye (R)

Ohio
 1. Harold Hitz Burton (R)
 3. Robert A. Taft (R)

Oklahoma
 2. Joshua B. Lee (D)
 3. Elmer Thomas (D)

Oregon
 2. Charles L. McNary (R)
 3. Rufus C. Holman (R)

Pennsylvania
 1. Joseph F. Guffey (D)
 3. James J. Davis (R)

Rhode Island
 1. Peter G. Gerry (D)
 2. Theodore F. Green (D)

South Carolina
 2. James F. Byrnes (D), until July 17, 1941
 Alva M. Lumpkin (D), July 22, 1941 – August 1, 1941
 Roger C. Peace (D), August 5, 1941 – November 4, 1941
 Burnet R. Maybank (D), from November 5, 1941
 3. Ellison D. Smith (D)

South Dakota
 2. William J. Bulow (D)
 3. John Chandler Gurney (R)

Tennessee
 1. Kenneth McKellar (D)
 2. Tom Stewart (D)

Texas
 1. Tom Connally (D)
 2. Morris Sheppard (D), until April 9, 1941
 Andrew Jackson Houston (D), April 21, 1941, until June 26, 1941
 W. Lee O'Daniel (D), from June 28, 1941

Utah
 1. Orrice Abram Murdock Jr. (D)
 3. Elbert D. Thomas (D)

Vermont
 1. Warren Austin (R)
 3. George Aiken (R), from January 10, 1941

Virginia
 1. Harry F. Byrd (D)
 2. Carter Glass (D)

Washington
 1. Monrad Wallgren (D)
 3. Homer Bone (D)

West Virginia
 1. Harley M. Kilgore (D)
 2. Matthew M. Neely (D), until January 12, 1941
 Joseph Rosier (D), January 13, 1941 – November 17, 1942
 Hugh Ike Shott (R), from November 18, 1942

Wisconsin
 1. Robert M. La Follette Jr. (P)
 3. Alexander Wiley (R)

Wyoming
 1. Joseph C. O'Mahoney (D)
 2. Henry H. Schwartz (D)

House of Representatives

Alabama
 . Frank W. Boykin (D)
 . George M. Grant (D)
 . Henry B. Steagall (D)
 . Sam Hobbs (D)
 . Joe Starnes (D)
 . Pete Jarman (D)
 . Walter W. Bankhead (D), until February 1, 1941
 Carter Manasco (D), from June 24, 1941
 . John Sparkman (D)
 . Luther Patrick (D)

Arizona
 . John R. Murdock (D)

Arkansas
 . Ezekiel C. Gathings (D)
 . Wilbur Mills (D)
 . Clyde T. Ellis (D)
 . William Fadjo Cravens (D)
 . David D. Terry (D)
 . William F. Norrell (D)
 . Oren Harris (D)

California
 . Clarence F. Lea (D)
 . Harry Lane Englebright (R)
 . Frank H. Buck (D), until September 17, 1942
 . Thomas Rolph (R)
 . Richard J. Welch (R)
 . Albert E. Carter (R)
 . John H. Tolan (D)
 . Jack Z. Anderson (R)
 . Bertrand W. Gearhart (R)
 . Alfred J. Elliott (D)
 . John Carl Hinshaw (R)
 . Jerry Voorhis (D)
 . Charles Kramer (D)
 . Thomas F. Ford (D)
 . John M. Costello (D)
 . Leland M. Ford (R)
 . Lee E. Geyer (D), until October 11, 1941
 Cecil R. King (D), from August 25, 1942
 . William Ward Johnson (R)
 . Harry R. Sheppard (D)
 . Edouard Izac (D)

Colorado
 . Lawrence Lewis (D)
 . William S. Hill (R)
 . John Chenoweth (R)
 . Edward T. Taylor (D), until September 3, 1941
 Robert F. Rockwell (R), from December 9, 1941

Connecticut
 . Lucien J. Maciora (D)
 . Herman P. Kopplemann (D)
 . William J. Fitzgerald (D)
 . James A. Shanley (D)
 . Le Roy D. Downs (D)
 . J. Joseph Smith (D), until November 4, 1941
 Joseph E. Talbot (R), from January 20, 1942

Delaware
 . Philip A. Traynor (D)

Florida
 . J. Hardin Peterson (D)
 . Robert A. Green (D)
 . Robert L. F. Sikes (D)
 . Pat Cannon (D)
 . Joe Hendricks (D)

Georgia
 . Hugh Peterson (D)
 . Edward E. Cox (D)
 . Stephen Pace (D)
 . Albert Sidney Camp (D)
 . Robert Ramspeck (D)
 . Carl Vinson (D)
 . Malcolm C. Tarver (D)
 . John S. Gibson (D)
 . B. Frank Whelchel (D)
 . Paul Brown (D)

Idaho
 . Compton I. White (D)
 . Henry Dworshak (R)

Illinois
 . Stephen A. Day (R)
 . William Stratton (R)
 . Arthur W. Mitchell (D)
 . Raymond S. McKeough (D)
 . Edward A. Kelly (D)
 . Harry P. Beam (D), until December 6, 1942
 . Adolph J. Sabath (D)
 . A. F. Maciejewski (D), until December 8, 1942
 . Leonard W. Schuetz (D)
 . Leo Kocialkowski (D)
 . Charles S. Dewey (R)
 . George A. Paddock (R)
 . Chauncey W. Reed (R)
 . Noah M. Mason (R)
 . Leo E. Allen (R)
 . Anton J. Johnson (R)
 . Robert B. Chiperfield (R)
 . Everett Dirksen (R)
 . Leslie Cornelius Arends (R)
 . Jessie Sumner (R)
 . William H. Wheat (R)
 . James M. Barnes (D)
 . George Evan Howell (R)
 . Edwin M. Schaefer (D)
 . Laurence F. Arnold (D)
 . James V. Heidinger (R)
 . C. W. Bishop (R)

Indiana
 . William T. Schulte (D)
 . Charles A. Halleck (R)
 . Robert A. Grant (R)
 . George W. Gillie (R)
 . Forest Harness (R)
 . Noble J. Johnson (R)
 . Gerald W. Landis (R)
 . John W. Boehne Jr. (D)
 . Earl Wilson (R)
 . Raymond S. Springer (R)
 . William H. Larrabee (D)
 . Louis Ludlow (D)

Iowa
 . Thomas E. Martin (R)
 . William S. Jacobsen (D)
 . John W. Gwynne (R)
 . Henry O. Talle (R)
 . Karl M. LeCompte (R)
 . Paul H. Cunningham (R)
 . Ben F. Jensen (R)
 . Fred C. Gilchrist (R)
 . Vincent F. Harrington (D), until September 5, 1942
 Harry E. Narey (R), from November 3, 1942

Kansas
 . William P. Lambertson (R)
 . U. S. Guyer (R)
 . Thomas Daniel Winter (R)
 . Edward Herbert Rees (R)
 . John Mills Houston (D)
 . Frank Carlson (R)
 . Clifford R. Hope (R)

Kentucky
 . Noble Jones Gregory (D)
 . Beverly M. Vincent (D)
 . Emmet O'Neal (D)
 . Edward W. Creal (D)
 . Brent Spence (D)
 . Virgil Chapman (D)
 . Andrew J. May (D)
 . Joe B. Bates (D)
 . John M. Robsion (R)

Louisiana
 . Felix Edward Hébert (D)
 . Hale Boggs (D)
 . James R. Domengeaux (D)
 . Overton Brooks (D)
 . Newt V. Mills (D)
 . Jared Y. Sanders Jr. (D)
 . Vance Plauché (D)
 . A. Leonard Allen (D)

Maine
 . James C. Oliver (R)
 . Margaret Chase Smith (R)
 . Frank Fellows (R)

Maryland
 . David Jenkins Ward (D)
 . William Purington Cole Jr. (D), until October 26, 1942
 . Thomas D'Alesandro Jr. (D)
 . John Ambrose Meyer (D)
 . Lansdale Sasscer (D)
 . William D. Byron (D), until February 27, 1941
 Katharine Byron (D), from May 27, 1941

Massachusetts
 . Allen T. Treadway (R)
 . Charles R. Clason (R)
 . Joseph E. Casey (D)
 . Pehr G. Holmes (R)
 . Edith Nourse Rogers (R)
 . George J. Bates (R)
 . Lawrence J. Connery (D), until October 19, 1941
 Thomas J. Lane (D), from December 30, 1941
 . Arthur D. Healey (D), until August 3, 1942
 . Thomas H. Eliot (D)
 . George H. Tinkham (R)
 . Thomas A. Flaherty (D)
 . John William McCormack (D)
 . Richard B. Wigglesworth (R)
 . Joseph William Martin Jr. (R)
 . Charles L. Gifford (R)

Michigan
 . Rudolph G. Tenerowicz (D)
 . Earl C. Michener (R)
 . Paul W. Shafer (R)
 . Clare Hoffman (R)
 . Bartel J. Jonkman (R)
 . William W. Blackney (R)
 . Jesse P. Wolcott (R)
 . Fred L. Crawford (R)
 . Albert J. Engel (R)
 . Roy O. Woodruff (R)
 . Fred Bradley (R)
 . Frank Eugene Hook (D)
 . George D. O'Brien (D)
 . Louis C. Rabaut (D)
 . John D. Dingell Sr. (D)
 . John Lesinski Sr. (D)
 . George Anthony Dondero (R)

Minnesota
 . August H. Andresen (R)
 . Joseph P. O'Hara (R)
 . Richard Pillsbury Gale (R)
 . Melvin Maas (R)
 . Oscar Youngdahl (R)
 . Harold Knutson (R)
 . Herman Carl Andersen (R)
 . William Pittenger (R)
 . Rich T. Buckler (FL)

Mississippi
 . John E. Rankin (D)
 . Wall Doxey (D), until September 28, 1941
 Jamie L. Whitten (D), from November 4, 1941
 . William M. Whittington (D)
 . Aaron L. Ford (D)
 . Ross A. Collins (D)
 . William M. Colmer (D)
 . Dan R. McGehee (D)

Missouri
 . Milton A. Romjue (D)
 . William L. Nelson (D)
 . Richard M. Duncan (D)
 . C. Jasper Bell (D)
 . Joe Shannon (D)
 . Philip A. Bennett (R), until December 7, 1942
 . Dewey J. Short (R)
 . Clyde Williams (D)
 . Clarence Cannon (D)
 . Orville Zimmerman (D)
 . John B. Sullivan (D)
 . Walter C. Ploeser (R)
 . John J. Cochran (D)

Montana
 . Jeannette Rankin (R)
 . James F. O'Connor (D)

Nebraska
 . Oren S. Copeland (R)
 . Charles F. McLaughlin (D)
 . Karl Stefan (R)
 . Carl Curtis (R)
 . Harry B. Coffee (D)

Nevada
 . James G. Scrugham (D), until December 7, 1942

New Hampshire
 . Arthur B. Jenks (R)
 . Foster Waterman Stearns (R)

New Jersey
 . Charles A. Wolverton (R)
 . Elmer H. Wene (D)
 . William H. Sutphin (D)
 . D. Lane Powers (R)
 . Charles A. Eaton (R)
 . Donald H. McLean (R)
 . J. Parnell Thomas (R)
 . Gordon Canfield (R)
 . Frank C. Osmers Jr. (R)
 . Fred A. Hartley Jr. (R)
 . Albert L. Vreeland (R)
 . Robert Kean (R)
 . Mary Teresa Norton (D)
 . Edward J. Hart (D)

New Mexico
 . Clinton Presba Anderson (D)

New York
 . Leonard W. Hall (R)
 . William Bernard Barry (D)
 . Joseph L. Pfeifer (D)
 . Thomas H. Cullen (D)
 . James J. Heffernan (D)
 . Andrew Lawrence Somers (D)
 . John J. Delaney (D)
 . Donald L. O'Toole (D)
 . Eugene James Keogh (D)
 . Emanuel Celler (D)
 . James A. O'Leary (D)
 . Samuel Dickstein (D)
 . Louis Capozzoli (D)
 . Morris Michael Edelstein (D), until June 4, 1941
 Arthur George Klein  (D), from July 29, 1941
 . Michael J. Kennedy (D)
 . William T. Pheiffer (R)
 . Kenneth F. Simpson (R), until January 25, 1941
 Joseph C. Baldwin  (R), from March 11, 1941
 . Martin J. Kennedy (D)
 . Sol Bloom (D)
 . Vito Marcantonio (AL)
 . Joseph A. Gavagan (D)
 . Walter A. Lynch (D)
 . Charles A. Buckley (D)
 . James M. Fitzpatrick (D)
 . Ralph A. Gamble (R)
 . Hamilton Fish III (R)
 . Lewis K. Rockefeller (R)
 . William T. Byrne (D)
 . E. Harold Cluett (R)
 . Frank Crowther (R)
 . Clarence E. Kilburn (R)
 . Francis D. Culkin (R)
 . Fred J. Douglas (R)
 . Edwin Arthur Hall (R)
 . Clarence E. Hancock (R)
 . John Taber (R)
 . W. Sterling Cole (R)
 . Joseph J. O'Brien (R)
 . James Wolcott Wadsworth Jr. (R)
 . Walter G. Andrews (R)
 . Alfred F. Beiter (D)
 . Pius Schwert (D), until March 11, 1941
 John C. Butler (R), from April 22, 1941
 . Daniel A. Reed (R)
 . Matthew J. Merritt (D)
 . Caroline Love Goodwin O'Day (D)

North Carolina
 . Herbert Covington Bonner (D)
 . John H. Kerr (D)
 . Graham Arthur Barden (D)
 . Harold D. Cooley (D)
 . Alonzo Dillard Folger (D), until April 30, 1941
 John Hamlin Folger (D), from June 14, 1941
 . Carl T. Durham (D)
 . J. Bayard Clark (D)
 . William O. Burgin (D)
 . Robert L. Doughton (D)
 . Alfred L. Bulwinkle (D)
 . Zebulon Weaver (D)

North Dakota
 . Charles R. Robertson (R)
 . Usher L. Burdick (R-NPL)

Ohio
 . George H. Bender (R)
 . Stephen M. Young (D)
 . Charles H. Elston (R)
 . William E. Hess (R)
 . Greg J. Holbrock (D)
 . Robert Franklin Jones (R)
 . Cliff Clevenger (R)
 . Jacob E. Davis (D)
 . Clarence J. Brown (R)
 . Frederick Cleveland Smith (R)
 . John F. Hunter (D)
 . Thomas A. Jenkins (R)
 . Harold K. Claypool (D)
 . John M. Vorys (R)
 . Albert David Baumhart Jr. (R), until September 2, 1942
 . Dow W. Harter (D)
 . Robert T. Secrest (D), until August 3, 1942
 . William R. Thom (D)
 . J. Harry McGregor (R)
 . Lawrence E. Imhoff (D)
 . Michael J. Kirwan (D)
 . Martin L. Sweeney (D)
 . Robert Crosser (D)
 . Frances P. Bolton (R)

Oklahoma
 . Will Rogers (D)
 . Wesley E. Disney (D)
 . John Conover Nichols (D)
 . Wilburn Cartwright (D)
 . Lyle Boren (D)
 . A. S. Mike Monroney (D)
 . Jed Johnson (D)
 . Sam C. Massingale (D), until January 17, 1941
 Victor Wickersham (D), from April 1, 1941
 . Ross Rizley (R)

Oregon
 . James W. Mott (R)
 . Walter M. Pierce (D)
 . Homer D. Angell (R)

Pennsylvania
 . Leon Sacks (D)
 . James P. McGranery (D)
 . Michael J. Bradley (D)
 . John E. Sheridan (D)
 . Francis R. Smith (D)
 . Francis J. Myers (D)
 . Hugh Scott (R)
 . James Wolfenden (R)
 . Charles L. Gerlach (R)
 . J. Roland Kinzer (R)
 . Patrick J. Boland (D), until May 18, 1942
 Veronica Grace Boland (D), from November 3, 1942
 . J. Harold Flannery (D), until January 3, 1942
 Thomas B. Miller (R), from May 19, 1942
 . Ivor D. Fenton (R)
 . Guy L. Moser (D)
 . Albert G. Rutherford (R), until August 10, 1941
 Wilson D. Gillette (R), from November 4, 1941
 . Robert F. Rich (R)
 . J. William Ditter (R)
 . Richard M. Simpson (R)
 . John C. Kunkel (R)
 . Benjamin Jarrett (R)
 . Francis E. Walter (D)
 . Harry L. Haines (D)
 . James E. Van Zandt (R)
 . J. Buell Snyder (D)
 . Charles I. Faddis (D), until December 4, 1942
 . Louis E. Graham (R)
 . Harve Tibbott (R)
 . Augustine B. Kelley (D)
 . Robert L. Rodgers (R)
 . Thomas E. Scanlon (D)
 . Samuel A. Weiss (D)
 . Herman P. Eberharter (D)
 . Joseph A. McArdle (D), until January 5, 1942
 Elmer J. Holland (D), from May 19, 1942
 . James A. Wright (D)

Rhode Island
 . Aime Forand (D)
 . John E. Fogarty (D)

South Carolina
 . L. Mendel Rivers (D)
 . Hampton P. Fulmer (D)
 . Butler B. Hare (D)
 . Joseph R. Bryson (D)
 . James P. Richards (D)
 . John L. McMillan (D)

South Dakota
 . Karl Earl Mundt (R)
 . Francis H. Case (R)

Tennessee
 . B. Carroll Reece (R)
 . John Jennings Jr. (R)
 . Estes Kefauver (D)
 . Albert Gore Sr. (D)
 . Percy Priest (D)
 . W. Wirt Courtney (D)
 . Herron C. Pearson (D)
 . Jere Cooper (D)
 . Clifford Davis (D)

Texas
 . Wright Patman (D)
 . Martin Dies Jr. (D)
 . Lindley Beckworth (D)
 . Sam Rayburn (D)
 . Hatton W. Sumners (D)
 . Luther Alexander Johnson (D)
 . Nat Patton (D)
 . Albert Thomas (D)
 . Joseph J. Mansfield (D)
 . Lyndon B. Johnson (D)
 . William R. Poage (D)
 . Fritz G. Lanham (D)
 . Ed Gossett (D)
 . Richard M. Kleberg (D)
 . Milton H. West (D)
 . R. Ewing Thomason (D)
 . Sam M. Russell (D)
 . Eugene Worley (D)
 . George H. Mahon (D)
 . Paul J. Kilday (D)
 . Charles L. South (D)

Utah
 . Walter K. Granger (D)
 . J. W. Robinson (D)

Vermont
 . Charles Albert Plumley (R)

Virginia
 . S. Otis Bland (D)
 . Colgate Darden (D), until March 1, 1941
 Winder R. Harris (D), from April 8, 1941
 . Dave E. Satterfield Jr. (D)
 . Patrick H. Drewry (D)
 . Thomas G. Burch (D)
 . Clifton A. Woodrum (D)
 . Absalom Willis Robertson (D)
 . Howard W. Smith (D)
 . John W. Flannagan Jr. (D)

Washington
 . Warren Magnuson (D)
 . Henry M. Jackson (D)
 . Martin F. Smith (D)
 . Knute Hill (D)
 . Charles H. Leavy (D), until August 1, 1942
 . John M. Coffee (D)

West Virginia
 . Robert L. Ramsay (D)
 . Jennings Randolph (D)
 . Andrew Edmiston Jr. (D)
 . George William Johnson (D)
 . John Kee (D)
 . Joe L. Smith (D)

Wisconsin
 . Stephen Bolles (R), until July 8, 1941
 Lawrence H. Smith (R), from August 29, 1941
 . Harry Sauthoff (P)
 . William H. Stevenson (R)
 . Thaddeus Wasielewski (D)
 . Lewis D. Thill (R)
 . Frank Bateman Keefe (R)
 . Reid F. Murray (R)
 . Joshua L. Johns (R)
 . Merlin Hull (P)
 . Bernard J. Gehrmann (P)

Wyoming
 . John J. McIntyre (D)

Non-voting members
 . Anthony J. Dimond (D)
 . Samuel Wilder King (R)
 . Joaquín Miguel Elizalde (I)
 . Bolívar Pagán (Soc.)

Changes in membership
The count below reflects changes from the beginning of this Congress.

Senate

|-
| West Virginia(2)
| nowrap  | Matthew M. Neely (D)
| Resigned January 12, 1941, after being elected Governor of West Virginia.Successor was appointed to serve until a special election, which he subsequently lost. In addition, successor took oath of office after the Senate resolved a challenge to the appointment.
| nowrap  | Joseph Rosier (D)
| January 13, 1941

|-
| Arkansas(2)
| nowrap  | John E. Miller (D)
| Resigned March 31, 1941, after being appointed judge for the US District Court for the Western District of Arkansas.Successor was appointed to finish the term.
| nowrap  | G. Lloyd Spencer (D)
| April 1, 1941

|-
| Texas(2)
| nowrap  | Morris Sheppard (D)
| Died April 9, 1941. Successor was appointed to serve until a special election.
| nowrap  | Andrew Jackson Houston (D)
| April 21, 1941

|-
| Mississippi(2)
| nowrap  | Pat Harrison (D)
| Died June 22, 1941.Successor was appointed to serve until a special election.
| nowrap  | James Eastland (D)
| June 30, 1941

|-
| Texas(2)
| nowrap  | Andrew Jackson Houston (D)
| Died June 26, 1941. Successor was elected to finish term.
| nowrap  | W. Lee O'Daniel (D)
| August 4, 1941

|-
| South Carolina(2)
| nowrap  | James F. Byrnes (D)
| Resigned July 17, 1941, after being appointed Associate Justice of the Supreme Court of the United States.Successor was appointed to serve until a special election.
| nowrap  | Alva M. Lumpkin (D)
| July 22, 1941

|-
| South Carolina(2)
| nowrap  | Alva M. Lumpkin (D)
| Died August 1, 1941. Successor was appointed to serve until a special election.
| nowrap  | Roger C. Peace (D)
| August 5, 1941

|-
| Mississippi(2)
| nowrap  | James Eastland (D)
| Appointee did not seek election to finish term. Successor was elected September 28, 1941, to finish term.
| nowrap  | Wall Doxey (D)
| September 29, 1941

|-
| South Carolina(2)
| nowrap  | Roger C. Peace (D)
| Appointee did not seek election to finish term. Successor was elected November 4, 1941, to finish term.
| nowrap  | Burnet R. Maybank (D)
| November 5, 1941

|-
| Colorado(3)
| nowrap  | Alva B. Adams (D)
| Died December 1, 1941.Successor was appointed to serve until the November 3, 1942, special election, which he won.
| nowrap  | Eugene Millikin (R)
| December 20, 1941

|-
| West Virginia(2)
| nowrap  | Joseph Rosier (D)
| Appointee lost election November 17, 1942, to finish the term.Successor was elected to finish term.
| nowrap  | Hugh Shott (R)
| November 18, 1942

|-
| Minnesota(2)
| nowrap  | Joseph H. Ball (R)
| Appointee did not seek election to finish term. Successor was elected November 17, 1942, to finish term.
| nowrap  | Arthur E. Nelson (R)
| November 18, 1942

|-
| Nevada(1)
| nowrap  | Berkeley L. Bunker (D)
| Appointee lost election December 7, 1942, to finish the term.Successor was elected to finish term.
| nowrap  | James G. Scrugham (D)
| December 7, 1942
|}

House of Representatives

|-
| 
|  | Sam C. Massingale (D)
| style="font-size:80%" | Died January 17, 1941 
|  | Victor Wickersham (D)
| April 1, 1941
|-
| 
|  | Kenneth F. Simpson (R)
| style="font-size:80%" | Died January 25, 1941 
|  | Joseph C. Baldwin (R)
| March 11, 1941
|-
| 
|  | Walter W. Bankhead (D)
| style="font-size:80%" | Resigned February 1, 1941 
|  | Carter Manasco (D)
| June 24, 1941
|-
| 
|  | William D. Byron (D)
| style="font-size:80%" | Died February 27, 1941 
|  | Katharine Byron (D)
| May 27, 1941
|-
| 
|  | Colgate Darden (D)
| style="font-size:80%" | Resigned March 1, 1941, to run for Governor of Virginia
|  | Winder R. Harris (D)
| April 8, 1941
|-
| 
|  | Pius L. Schwert (D)
| style="font-size:80%" | Died March 11, 1941 
|  | John C. Butler (R)
| April 22, 1941
|-
| 
|  | Alonzo D. Folger (D)
| style="font-size:80%" | Died April 30, 1941 
|  | John H. Folger (D)
| June 14, 1941
|-
| 
|  | Morris M. Edelstein (D)
| style="font-size:80%" | Died June 4, 1941 
|  | Arthur G. Klein (D)
| July 29, 1941
|-
| 
|  | Stephen Bolles (R)
| style="font-size:80%" | Died July 8, 1941 
|  | Lawrence H. Smith (R)
| August 29, 1941
|-
| 
|  | Albert G. Rutherford (R)
| style="font-size:80%" | Died August 10, 1941
|  | Wilson D. Gillette (R)
| November 4, 1941
|-
| 
|  | Edward T. Taylor (D)
| style="font-size:80%" | Died September 3, 1941 
|  | Robert F. Rockwell (R)
| December 9, 1941
|-
| 
|  | Wall Doxey (D)
| style="font-size:80%" | Resigned September 28, 1941, after being elected to the US Senate
|  | Jamie L. Whitten (D)
| November 4, 1941
|-
| 
|  | Lee E. Geyer (D)
| style="font-size:80%" | Died October 11, 1941 
|  | Cecil R. King (D)
| August 25, 1942
|-
| 
|  | Lawrence J. Connery (D)
| style="font-size:80%" | Died October 19, 1941 
|  | Thomas J. Lane (D)
| December 30, 1941
|-
| 
|  | J. Joseph Smith (D)
| style="font-size:80%" | Resigned November 4, 1941, after being appointed judge for the United States District Court for the District of Connecticut
|  | Joseph E. Talbot (R)
| January 20, 1942
|-
| 
|  | J. Harold Flannery (D)
| style="font-size:80%" | Resigned January 3, 1942, after becoming judge of common pleas for Luzerne County, PA
|  | Thomas B. Miller (R)
| May 19, 1942
|-
| 
|  | Joseph A. McArdle (D)
| style="font-size:80%" | Resigned January 5, 1942, after being elected to the Pittsburgh City Council 
|  | Elmer J. Holland (D)
| May 19, 1942
|-
| 
|  | Patrick J. Boland (D)
| style="font-size:80%" | Died May 18, 1942 
|  | Veronica G. Boland (D)
| November 3, 1942
|-
| 
|  | Arthur D. Healey (D)
| style="font-size:80%" | Resigned August 1, 1942, after being appointed judge for the United States District Court for the Western District of Washington
| colspan=2 | Vacant until the next Congress
|-
| 
|  | Charles H. Leavy (D)
| style="font-size:80%" | Resigned August 3, 1942, after being appointed judge for the United States District Court for the District of Massachusetts
| colspan=2 | Vacant until the next Congress
|-
| 
|  | Robert T. Secrest (D)
| style="font-size:80%" | Resigned August 3, 1942, after accepting a commission in the U.S. Navy
| colspan=2 | Vacant until the next Congress
|-
| 
|  | Albert D. Baumhart Jr. (R)
| style="font-size:80%" | Resigned September 2, 1942, after accepting a commission in the U.S. Navy
| colspan=2 | Vacant until the next Congress
|-
| 
|  | Vincent F. Harrington (D)
| style="font-size:80%" | Resigned September 5, 1942, after accepting a commission as major in the United States Army
|  | Harry E. Narey (R)
| November 3, 1942
|-
| 
|  | Frank H. Buck (D)
| style="font-size:80%" | Died September 17, 1942
| colspan=2 | Vacant until the next Congress
|-
| 
|  | William Purington Cole Jr. (D)
| style="font-size:80%" | Resigned October 26, 1942, after being appointed judge for the U.S. Customs Court
| colspan=2 | Vacant until the next Congress
|-
| 
|  | Charles I. Faddis (D)
| style="font-size:80%" | Resigned December 4, 1942, to enter the US Army
| colspan=2 | Vacant until the next Congress
|-
| 
|  | Harry P. Beam (D)
| style="font-size:80%" | Resigned December 6, 1942, after being elected judge for the municipal court of Chicago
| colspan=2 | Vacant until the next Congress
|-
| 
|  | A. F. Maciejewski (D)
| style="font-size:80%" | Resigned December 6, 1942
| colspan=2 | Vacant until the next Congress
|-
| 
|  | Philip A. Bennett (R)
| style="font-size:80%" | Died December 7, 1942
| colspan=2 | Vacant until the next Congress
|-
| 
|  | James G. Scrugham (D)
| style="font-size:80%" | Resigned December 7, 1942, after being elected to the U.S. Senate
| colspan=2 | Vacant until the next Congress
|}

Committees

Senate

 Agriculture and Forestry (Chairman: Ellison D. Smith; Ranking Member: George W. Norris)
 Agricultural Labor Shortages in the West (Special)
 Appropriations (Chairman: Carter Glass; Ranking Member: Gerald P. Nye)
 Audit and Control the Contingent Expenses of the Senate (Chairman: Scott W. Lucas; Ranking Member: N/A)
 Banking and Currency (Chairman: Robert F. Wagner; Ranking Member: Charles W. Tobey)
 Civil Service (Chairman: William J. Bulow; Ranking Member: Wallace H. White Jr.)
 Civil Service Laws (Special)
 Claims (Chairman: Prentiss M. Brown; Ranking Member: Arthur Capper)
 Commerce (Chairman: Josiah W. Bailey; Ranking Member: Charles L. McNary)
 District of Columbia (Chairman: Pat McCarran; Ranking Member: Arthur Capper)
 Education and Labor (Chairman: Elbert D. Thomas; Ranking Member: Robert M. La Follette Jr.)
 Enrolled Bills (Chairman: Hattie W. Caraway; Ranking Member: Clyde M. Reed)
 Expenditures in Executive Departments (Chairman: J. Lister Hill; Ranking Member: James J. Davis)
 Finance (Chairman: Walter F. George; Ranking Member: Robert M. La Follette Jr.)
 Foreign Relations (Chairman: Tom Connally; Ranking Member: Hiram W. Johnson)
 Fiscal Affairs of the Government (Special)
 Fuel Situation in the Middle West (Special)
 [mFuels in the Areas West of the Mississippi (Special)
 Gasoline and Fuel Oil Shortages (Special)
 Immigration (Chairman: Richard B. Russell; Ranking Member: Hiram W. Johnson)
 Indian Affairs (Chairman: Elmer Thomas; Ranking Member: Robert M. La Follette Jr.)
 Interoceanic Canals (Chairman: Bennett Champ Clark; Ranking Member: Styles Bridges)
 Interstate Commerce (Chairman: Burton K. Wheeler; Ranking Member: Wallace H. White Jr.)
 Investigate the National Defense Program (Special)
 Irrigation and Reclamation (Chairman: John H. Bankhead II; Ranking Member: Charles L. McNary)
 Judiciary (Chairman: Frederick Van Nuys; Ranking Member: George W. Norris)
 Library (Chairman: Alben W. Barkley; Ranking Member: Charles L. McNary)
 Manufactures (Chairman: John H. Overton; Ranking Member: Robert M. La Follette Jr.)
 Military Affairs (Chairman: Robert R. Reynolds; Ranking Member: Warren R. Austin)
 Mines and Mining (Chairman: Joseph F. Guffey; Ranking Member: James J. Davis)
 Naval Affairs (Chairman: David I. Walsh; Ranking Member: James J. Davis)
 Old-Age Pension System (Select)
 Patents (Chairman: Homer T. Bone; Ranking Member: Wallace H. White Jr.)
 Pensions (Chairman: Henry H. Schwartz; Ranking Member: Henrik Shipstead)
 Post Office and Post Roads (Chairman: Kenneth McKellar; Ranking Member: Robert M. La Follette Jr.)
 Printing (Chairman: Carl Hayden; Ranking Member: Chan Gurney)
 Privileges and Elections (Chairman: Theodore F. Green; Ranking Member: Warren R. Austin)
 Public Buildings and Grounds (Chairman: Francis Maloney; Ranking Member: W. Warren Barbour)
 Public Lands and Surveys (Chairman: Carl A. Hatch; Ranking Member: Gerald P. Nye)
 Rules (Chairman: Harry F. Byrd; Ranking Member: Arthur H. Vandenberg)
 Senatorial Campaign Expenditures (Special) (Chairman: Guy M. Gillette)
 Small Business Enterprises (Special) (Chairman: James E. Murray)
 Territories and Insular Affairs (Chairman: Millard E. Tydings; Ranking Member: Gerald P. Nye)
 Whole
 Wildlife Resources (Special) (Chairman: Bennett Champ Clark)
 Wool Production (Special) (Chairman: Alva B. Adams)

House of Representatives

 Accounts (Chairman: John J. Cochran; Ranking Member: James Wolfenden)
 Agriculture (Chairman: Hampton P. Fulmer; Ranking Member: Clifford R. Hope)
 Air Accidents (Select) (Chairman: Jack Nichols)
 Appropriations (Chairman: Clarence Cannon; Ranking Member: John Taber)
 Banking and Currency (Chairman: Henry B. Steagall; Ranking Member: Jesse P. Wolcott)
 Census (Chairman: Guy L. Moser; Ranking Member: J. Roland Kinzer)
 Civil Service (Chairman: Robert Ramspeck; Ranking Member: Edith Nourse Rogers)
 Claims (Chairman: Dan R. McGehee; Ranking Member: J. Parnell Thomas)
 Coinage, Weights and Measures (Chairman: Andrew Somers; Ranking Member: Chauncey W. Reed)
 Conservation of Wildlife Resources (Select) (Chairman: A. Willis Robertson)
 Disposition of Executive Papers (Chairman: Alfred J. Elliott; Ranking Member: Bertrand W. Gearhart)
 District of Columbia (Chairman: Jennings Randolph; Ranking Member: Everett M. Dirksen)
 Education (Chairman: William H. Larrabee; Ranking Member: George A. Dondero)
 Election of the President, Vice President and Representatives in Congress (Chairman: Caroline O'Day; Ranking Member: George H. Tinkham)
 Elections No.#1 (Chairman: C. Jasper Bell; Ranking Member: Clarence E. Hancock)
 Elections No.#2 (Chairman: Joseph A. Gavagan; Ranking Member: Francis D. Culkin)
 Elections No.#3 (Chairman: Albert Thomas; Ranking Member: Charles A. Plumley)
 Enrolled Bills (Chairman: Michael J. Kirwan; Ranking Member: Charles Aubrey Eaton)
 Expenditures in the Executive Departments (Chairman: James A. O'Leary; Ranking Member: Charles L. Gifford)
 Flood Control (Chairman: William M. Whittington; Ranking Member: Harry Lane Englebright)
 Foreign Affairs (Chairman: Sol Bloom; Ranking Member: Hamilton Fish III)
 Immigration and Naturalization (Chairman: Samuel Dickstein; Ranking Member: Noah M. Mason)
 Indian Affairs (Chairman: Will Rogers; Ranking Member: Fred C. Gilchrist)
 Insular Affairs (Chairman: Leo Kocialkowski; Ranking Member: Richard J. Welch)
 Interstate and Foreign Commerce (Chairman: Clarence F. Lea; Ranking Member: Charles A. Wolverton) 
 Investigate National Defense Migration (Select) (Chairman: N/A; Ranking Member: N/A)
 Invalid Pensions (Chairman: John Lesinski; Ranking Member: Robert F. Jones)
 Irrigation and Reclamation (Chairman: Compton I. White; Ranking Member: Dewey Jackson Short)
 Judiciary (Chairman: Hatton W. Sumners; Ranking Member: Ulysses S. Guyer)
 Labor (Chairman: Mary Teresa Norton; Ranking Member: Richard J. Welch)
 Library (Chairman: N/A; Ranking Member: Allen T. Treadway)
 Memorials (Chairman: Harry P. Beam; Ranking Member: Frank Crowther)
 Merchant Marine and Fisheries (Chairman: S. Otis Bland; Ranking Member: Richard J. Welch)
 Military Affairs (Chairman: Andrew J. May; Ranking Member: Walter G. Andrews)
 Mines and Mining (Chairman: Joe L. Smith; Ranking Member: Harry Lane Englebright)
 Naval Affairs (Chairman: Carl Vinson; Ranking Member: Melvin J. Maas)
 Patents (Chairman: Charles Kramer; Ranking Member: Fred A. Hartley Jr.)
 Pensions (Chairman: Martin F. Smith; Ranking Member: Fred J. Douglas)
 Post Office and Post Roads (Chairman: Milton A. Romjue; Ranking Member: Fred A. Hartley Jr.)
 Public Buildings and Grounds (Chairman: Fritz G. Lanham; Ranking Member: Pehr G. Holmes)
 Public Lands (Chairman: Martin F. Smith; Ranking Member: Harry Lane Englebright)
 Revision of Laws (Chairman: Milton A. Romjue; Ranking Member: Earl C. Michener)
 Rivers and Harbors (Chairman: J.W. Robinson; Ranking Member: Albert E. Carter)
 Roads (Chairman: Wilburn Cartwright; Ranking Member: Jesse P. Wolcott)
 Rules (Chairman: Adolph J. Sabath; Ranking Member: Hamilton Fish III)
 Small Business (Select)
 Standards of Official Conduct
 Territories (Chairman: Robert A. Green; Ranking Member: Lewis K. Rockefeller)
 War Claims (Chairman: Joseph A. Gavagan; Ranking Member: Clare E. Hoffman)
 Ways and Means (Chairman: Robert L. Doughton; Ranking Member: Allen T. Treadway)
 World War Veterans' Legislation (Chairman: John E. Rankin; Ranking Member: Edith Nourse Rogers)
 Whole

Joint committees

 United States Congress Joint Committee to Arrange the Inauguration for President-elect|Arrange the Inauguration for President-elect (Chairman: Sen. Matthew M. Neely)
 Conditions of Indian Tribes (Special)
 United States Congress Joint Committee on the Disposition of Executive Papers|Disposition of (Useless) Executive Papers
 United States Congress Joint Committee on the Eradication of the Mediterranean Fruit Fly|Eradication of the Mediterranean Fruit Fly
 Forestry (Chairman: Sen. John H. Bankhead II; Vice Chairman: Rep. Hampton P. Fulmer)
 United States Congress Joint Committee on Government Organization (Chairman: Sen. James F. Byrnes)
 The Library (Chairman: Sen. Alben W. Barkley)
 Printing (Chairman: Sen. Carl Hayden; Vice Chairman: Rep. Pete Jarman)
 United States Congress Joint Committee on Reduction of Nonessential Federal Expenditures|Reduction of Nonessential Federal Expenditures
 Taxation (Chairman: Sen. Pat Harrison then Rep. Robert L. Doughton; Vice Chairman: Sen. Walter F. George)
 United States Congress Joint Committee on to Investigate Phosphate Resource of the United States|To Investigate Phosphate Resource of the United States (Chairman: J. Hardin Peterson)

Caucuses
 Democratic (House)
 Democratic (Senate)

Employees

Legislative branch agency directors
 Architect of the Capitol: David Lynn
 Attending Physician of the United States Congress: George Calver
 Comptroller General of the United States: Lindsay C. Warren
 Librarian of Congress: Archibald MacLeish 
 Public Printer of the United States: Augustus E. Giegengack

Senate
 Secretary: Edwin A. Halsey
 Librarian: Ruskin McArdle
 Secretary for the Majority: Leslie Biffle
 Secretary for the Minority: Carl A. Loeffler
 Sergeant at Arms: Chesley W. Jurney
 Parliamentarian: Charles Watkins
 Chaplain: ZeBarney Thorne Phillips (Episcopal), until May 1942
 Frederick Brown Harris (Methodist), after October 10, 1942

House of Representatives
 Clerk: South Trimble 
 Sergeant at Arms: Kenneth Romney
 Parliamentarian:  Lewis Deschler
 Reading Clerks: Roger M. Calloway (D) and Alney E. Chaffee (R)
 Doorkeeper: Joseph J. Sinnott
 Postmaster: Finis E. Scott
 Chaplain: James Shera Montgomery (Methodist)

See also 
 1940 United States elections (elections leading to this Congress)
 1940 United States presidential election
 1940 United States Senate elections
 1940 United States House of Representatives elections
 1942 United States elections (elections during this Congress, leading to the next Congress)
 1942 United States Senate elections
 1942 United States House of Representatives elections

Notes

References